Sydney Albert Edward Murphy (born 28 March 1960) is a former Vincentian cricketer. Murphy was a right-handed batsman who bowled right-arm fast-medium.

Born in the farming community of Lowman's Hill on the island of Saint Vincent, Murphy made his debut for the Windward Islands in a 1983/84 Shell Shield first-class match against Trinidad and Tobago. Subsequent to this, he had played for Saint Vincent and the Grenadines in minor regional matches since 1981. He travelled to England in 1985, where he played a one-day minor counties match for Cornwall in the MCCA Knockout Trophy. He continued to play for the Windward Islands until the 1986/87 West Indian season, making a total of seven first-class and three List A appearances, without notable success.

References

External links
Sydney Murphy at ESPNcricinfo
Sydney Murphy at CricketArchive

1960 births
Living people
People from Saint Vincent (Antilles)
Saint Vincent and the Grenadines cricketers
Windward Islands cricketers
Cornwall cricketers